Princess Maria Anna von Schwarzenberg (25 December 1706 – 12 January 1755) was a Margravine consort of Baden-Baden and Princess of Schwarzenberg by birth. She was the daughter of Prince Adam Franz von Schwarzenberg and Princess Eleonore von Lobkowicz.

She married Louis George, Margrave of Baden-Baden on 18 March 1721. Her future mother-in-law traveled to Vienna in order to seek permission from Charles VI, Holy Roman Emperor. Permission was granted, and she married on 8 April 1721 at the Český Krumlov Castle

Issue
 Princess Elisabeth Augusta of Baden-Baden (16 March 1726 – 7 January 1789); married on 2 February 1755 to Count Michael Wenzel of Althann, Imperial Privy Councilor; no issue.
 Karl Ludwig Damian, Hereditary Prince of Baden-Baden (25 August 1728 – 6 July 1734); died in infancy.
 Georg Ludwig, Hereditary Prince of Baden-Baden (11 August 1736 – 11 March 1737); died in infancy.
 Princess Johanna of Baden-Baden (28 April 1737 – 29 April 1737); died in infancy.

References

 

  

1706 births
1755 deaths
Margravines of Baden-Baden
House of Zähringen
Schwarzenberg family
18th-century German people